This is a list of vegetable dishes, that includes dishes in which the main ingredient or one of the essential ingredients is a vegetable or vegetables.

In culinary terms, a vegetable is an edible plant or its part, intended for cooking or eating raw. Many vegetable-based dishes exist throughout the world.

Vegetable dishes

By main ingredient

Eggplant dishes

Legume dishes

Potato dishes

By type

Salads

Soups

By country

Indian vegetable dishes

Pakistani vegetable dishes

See also

 List of salads
 List of squash and pumpkin dishes
 List of vegetables
 List of foods
 Veggie burger
 Vegetarian cuisine

References

External links
 

 
Vegetable Dishes